Bicyclus vulgaris, the vulgar bush brown, is a butterfly in the family Nymphalidae. It is found in Senegal, the Gambia, Mali, Guinea-Bissau, Guinea, Burkina Faso, Sierra Leone, Liberia, Ivory Coast, Ghana, Togo, Benin, Nigeria, Cameroon, the Republic of the Congo, Angola, the Democratic Republic of the Congo, Uganda, Ethiopia, western Kenya, Tanzania and north-western Zambia. The habitat consists of forests (including pre-forest and riparian forest), dense savanna, the edges of farmland, woodland and marshy areas.

The larvae feed on Poaceae species.

References

Elymniini
Butterflies described in 1868
Butterflies of Africa
Taxa named by Arthur Gardiner Butler